The American Society for Precision Engineering is a non-profit member association, founded in 1986, dedicated to advancing the arts, sciences and technology of precision engineering, to promote its dissemination through education and training, and its use by science and industry.

Overview 
The American Society for Precision Engineering (ASPE) focuses on many areas that are important in the research, design, development, manufacture and measurement of high accuracy components and systems.  This collective discipline is known as Precision engineering, and includes precision controls, metrology, interferometry, materials, materials processing, nanotechnology, optical fabrication, precision optics, precision replication, scanning microscopes, semiconductor processing, standards and ultra-precision machining.

History 
There has long been a "community" of precision engineers within the United States but a formal structure and common focus for the activities was lacking.  This was not the case in Japan, as evidenced by the large and active Japanese Society of Precision Engineers.  In November 1985, a joint US-Japanese meeting on precision engineering included a special session to discuss the possibility of forming an American Society.  The enthusiasm of the participants and the overwhelming response to a subsequent questionnaire provided momentum.  By November 1986, the American Society for Precision Engineering was incorporated and held its first Annual Meeting in Dallas, Texas.  The theme of the well-attended meeting, "Thresholds in Precision Engineering," was reflected in 28 papers covering a broad spectrum of applications.  At this meeting, a Board of Directors was elected with members drawn from industry, private laboratories, government and academia.

ASPE emphasizes the foundations necessary to achieve precision in any application and seeks to bring together practitioners from all of the related fields. The Annual Meeting, held each fall, presents topics spanning the field of precision engineering.

Conferences and Exhibitions
  1st Annual Meeting,  Dallas, Texas,  November 1986
  2nd Annual Meeting,  Columbus, Ohio,  November 1987
  3rd Annual Meeting,  Atlanta, Georgia,  October 1988
  4th Annual Meeting,  Monterey, California,  September 1989
  5th Annual Meeting,  Raleigh, North Carolina,  September 1990
  6th Annual Meeting,  Santa Fe, New Mexico,  October 1991
  7th Annual Meeting,  Grenelefe, Florida,  October 1992
  8th Annual Meeting,  Seattle, Washington,  November 1993
  9th Annual Meeting,  Cincinnati, Ohio,  October 1994
 10th Annual Meeting,  Austin, Texas,  October 1995
 11th Annual Meeting,  Monterey, California,  November 1996
 12th Annual Meeting,  Norfolk, Virginia,  October 1997
 13th Annual Meeting,  St. Louis, Missouri,  October 1998
 14th Annual Meeting,  Monterey, California,  October 1999
 15th Annual Meeting,  Scottsdale, Arizona,  October 2000
 16th Annual Meeting,  Crystal City, Virginia,  November 2001
 17th Annual Meeting,  St. Louis, Missouri,  October 2002
 18th Annual Meeting,  Portland, Oregon,  October 2003
 19th Annual Meeting,  Orlando, Florida,  October 2004
 20th Annual Meeting,  Norfolk, Virginia,  October 2005
 21st Annual Meeting,  Monterey, California,  October 2006
 22nd Annual Meeting,  Dallas, Texas,  October 2007
 23rd Annual Meeting,  Portland, Oregon,  October 2008
 24th Annual Meeting,  Monterey, California,  October 2009
 25th Annual Meeting,  Atlanta, Georgia,  October/November 2010
 26th Annual Meeting,  Denver, Colorado,  October 2011
 27th Annual Meeting,  San Diego, California,  October 2012
 28th Annual Meeting,  St. Paul, Minnesota,  October 2013
 29th Annual Meeting,  Boston, Massachusetts,  November 2014
 30th Annual Meeting,  Austin, Texas,  November 2015
 31st Annual Meeting,  Portland, Oregon,  October 2016
 33rd Annual Meeting,  Las Vegas, Nevada,  November 2018
 34th Annual Meeting,  Pittsburgh, Pennsylvania,  October/November 2019

Publications
The Society jointly publishes a peer-reviewed technical journal, Precision Engineering: Journal of the International Societies of Precision Engineering and Nanotechnology, in cooperation with its European and Japanese counterparts.

Lifetime achievement award
The American Society for Precision Engineering presents the ASPE Lifetime Achievement Award to individuals who have made significant contributions to the field of Precision Engineering.

References

External links 
 American Society for Precision Engineering

Engineering societies based in the United States
Mechanical engineering organizations